Ira (İra) is a rural locality (a selo) in Kumertau, Bashkortostan, Russia. The population was 559 as of 2010. There are 6 streets.

Geography 
Ira is located 17 km northeast of Kumertau. Pchelka is the nearest rural locality.

References 

Rural localities in Kumertau